Antonia (minor planet designation: 272 Antonia) is a main belt asteroid that was discovered by French astronomer Auguste Charlois on 4 February 1888 in Nice.

Photometric observations of this asteroid made during 2008 at the Organ Mesa Observatory in Las Cruces, New Mexico, gave a light curve with a short rotation period of 3.8548 ± 0.0001 hours and a brightness variation of 0.43 ± 0.04 in magnitude.

References

External links
 
 

Hoffmeister asteroids
Antonia
Antonia
X-type asteroids (SMASS)
18880204